Lieutenant Rudolf Stark (11 February 1897 – after 1933) was a World War I flying ace credited with eleven confirmed and five unconfirmed aerial victories.

World War I military service
Stark originally served heroically in the 2nd Royal Bavarian Uhlans, winning his native Bavaria's Military Merit Order on 29 September 1915 and the Second Class Iron Cross on 11 June 1916. He switched to aviation; his first assignment was to FAA 296, a reconnaissance unit, on 15 November 1917. Stark requested a transfer to fighter duty, was sent to Jastachule II, and was transferred to Jagdstaffel 34 on 18 January 1918. He was notably one of the eyewitnesses to the landing of the famous German flying ace Manfred von Richthofen, the Red Baron; he witnessed Richthofen make a smooth landing after his final fight, in a field on a hill near the Bray-Corbie road, just north of Vaux-sur-Somme.<ref name="channel4">
Dogfight - The Mystery of the Red Baron, Channel 4, Secret History, 22 December 2003. US broadcast as "Who Killed the Red Baron? Explore Competing Theories." Pbs.org, (Public Broadcasting Service) Nova, 7 October 2003.</ref> By the time he was promoted to acting commander of Jagdstaffel 77, on 24 May 1918, he was an ace, with five victories confirmed and one unconfirmed claim. He had only one of three victory claims approved while he led 77. On 7 June, he received command of Jagdstaffel 35. Beginning 1 July, he shot down five more enemy planes, using a Fokker Dr.I designated by a lilac engine cowling and lilac band around its fuselage. He was wounded in action on 16 September, but carried on right up to his final victory two days before the Armistice.

Post World War I
Stark wrote Wings of War: an Airman's Diary of the Last Year of World War One in 1933.

Further readingWings of War: an Airman's Diary of the Last Year of World War One Author Rudolf Stark. Translated by Claud Walter Sykes. Arms and Armour Press, 1973, 

End notes

ReferencesAbove the Lines: The Aces and Fighter Units of the German Air Service, Naval Air Service and Flanders Marine Corps 1914–1918'' Norman L. R. Franks, et al. Grub Street, 1993. , .

German Army  personnel of World War I
1897 births
Year of death missing
People from Neuburg an der Donau
Luftstreitkräfte personnel
Military personnel from Bavaria
German World War I flying aces
German autobiographers